Maple Park is a village in DeKalb and Kane counties in the U.S. state of Illinois. The population was 1,433 at the 2020 census, up from 1,310 at the 2010 census. Maple Park was formerly known as Lodi.

History
Maple Park was originally called "Lodi", after Lodi, Lombardy. The present name comes from a nearby grove of sugar maple trees. A post office called "Lodi" was established first in 1837, and the post office was renamed "Maple Park" in 1880.

Geography
Maple Park is located at  (41.908514, -88.597989), with the majority of the population in Kane County but with more area in DeKalb County. Illinois Route 38 runs through the southern side of the village, leading east  to Geneva and west  to DeKalb.

Demographics

As of the 2020 census there were 1,433 people, 530 households, and 404 families residing in the village. The racial makeup of the village was 89.46% White, 0.21% African American, 0.70% Asian, 2.37% from other races, and 7.26% from two or more races. Hispanic or Latino of any race were 7.96% of the population.

There were 530 households, out of which 60.38% had children under the age of 18 living with them, 64.15% were married couples living together, 9.81% had a female householder with no husband present, and 23.77% were non-families. 15.09% of all households were made up of individuals, and 8.30% had someone living alone who was 65 years of age or older. The average household size was 3.37 and the average family size was 3.02.

The village's age distribution consisted of 20.8% under the age of 18, 11.6% from 18 to 24, 22.8% from 25 to 44, 31.6% from 45 to 64, and 13.3% who were 65 years of age or older. The median age was 41.8 years. For every 100 females, there were 101.9 males. For every 100 females age 18 and over, there were 103.5 males.

The median income for a household in the village was $90,833, and the median income for a family was $105,714. Males had a median income of $53,092 versus $36,667 for females. The per capita income for the village was $34,935. About 1.0% of families and 2.6% of the population were below the poverty line, including 0.0% of those under age 18 and 0.0% of those age 65 or over.

Education
Kaneland Community Unit School District 302 operates Kaneland High School.

References

External links
Official website

Villages in DeKalb County, Illinois
Villages in Kane County, Illinois
Villages in Illinois
1837 establishments in Illinois